Luka Uskoković (born 10 April 1996) is a Montenegrin football defender who plays for Slovenian PrvaLiga side Maribor.

Career
Uskoković started his career with Budućnost Podgorica. In 2014, he signed for Slovenian club Maribor, where he made 28 appearances and scored one goal in all competitions before his contract expired in the summer of 2021. After failing to find a new club for several months, he re-signed with Maribor in November 2021.

Notes

References

External links
 NZS profile 
 

1996 births
Living people
Montenegrin footballers
Association football defenders
NK Maribor players
Slovenian Second League players
Slovenian PrvaLiga players
Montenegrin expatriate footballers
Expatriate footballers in Slovenia
Montenegrin expatriate sportspeople in Slovenia
Montenegro youth international footballers
Montenegro under-21 international footballers